Soufrière is a village on the southwest coast of Dominica. It is the capital of Saint Mark Parish and has a population of 1,416 people.

Gallery

References

External links

Photos from Soufrière

Populated places in Dominica